Mia Rosales St. John (born June 24, 1967) is an American professional boxer and former World Boxing Council (WBC) champion in the super welterweight division. She is also the IBA and IFBA lightweight champion. She is also a model, businesswoman, and taekwondo champion.

Early life 
St. John, a Mexican-American with family roots in Zacatecas, Mexico, was born in San Francisco, California. She attended California State University, Northridge, earning a degree in psychology. While a student, she compiled a taekwondo record of 27–1, was awarded a black belt, and worked as a model to fund her education.

She married actor Kristoff St. John. They had two children, son Julian (1989–2014) and daughter Paris. The marriage ended in divorce.

Professional boxing career 
At the age of 29, St. John decided to become a professional boxer. In her first bout on February 14, 1997, she knocked out Angelica Villain in 54 seconds of the first round, earning her the nickname "The Knockout."

St. John, whose first manager was Art Lovett, in partnership with his brother Stewart Lovett, would eventually sign a contract with Don King and then Top Rank Boxing, and was featured on the undercard of Oscar De La Hoya bouts. She had 23 fights and won 22 with one draw, 3 KOs and 9 TKOs. All fights were four-rounders and most were televised gaining her national attention. St. John was crowned the "Queen of the Four-Rounders", a title she hated. St. John's opponents were selected by Top Rank without her input.

After her twentieth bout, St. John was injured in a skiing accident that threatened possible amputation of one of her legs. She underwent two operations to remove a blood clot.

In November 1999, St. John appeared on the cover of Playboy magazine and in an 11-page pictorial. She wanted to show that she was a feminine woman as well as an athlete. Critical of her career, the boxing press added the term "Busty Bunny Boxer" in describing St. John.

St. John did not renew her contract with Top Rank in 2001, becoming her own manager and promoter. On November 9, 2001, she lost her first fight to Rolanda Andrews with a TKO in the second round, St. John's first contest after parting with Top Rank.

Eduardo and Roberto Garcia 
St. John turned to trainers Eduardo and Roberto Garcia to learn proper punching techniques, footwork, and defensive strategies. St. John won her next four bouts, one by TKO.

On December 6, 2002, St. John fought top boxer Christy Martin. Martin had a record of 44 wins, 2 losses, and 2 draws. The press laughed at the match-up and predicted St. John would be knocked out early in the bout. St. John, coming up two weight classes, lost the bout but fought toe-to-toe with Martin all ten rounds for a credible performance.

WBC, IFBA and IBA lightweight championships 
On June 12, 2005, and after 47 professional bouts and 9 years, St. John was given a title bout with Liz Drew. St. John won by unanimous decision, earning the International Female Boxers Association lightweight world title. She followed this win with a unanimous decision over Donna Biggers in August, winning the IBA continental lightweight title.

St. John has fought all over the world, including Beijing, China, where she won her IBA Championship. After accumulating an unheard of boxing record of nearly 60 pro fights, on June 14, 2008, St. John fulfilled her dream of fighting in her mother's home country of Mexico. She fought one of the toughest fights of her career and became the WBC international boxing champion of the world at the age of 40.

In November 2008, she was awarded by the Governor of Zacatecas, Mexico, an outstanding achievement award for her role in sports and humanitarianism. The WBC also presented her with the 2008 "WBC Goodwill Ambassador" Award.

In November 2010, Rep. Grace Napolitano joined St. John and LA Laker Ron Artest for an official mental health and suicide prevention training at Napolitano's district office in Santa Fe Springs. Artest and St. John have joined Napolitano to promote the Mental Health in Schools Act, legislation she authored which would increase federal funding for mental health therapists in schools.

She also spoke at the Congressional Hispanic Caucus, where President Barack Obama made a speech at the CHCI's annual Gala.

As well as Congress, St. John speaks in schools and juvenile halls on the importance of education and overcoming hardship. She speaks of her own battles with mental illness, addiction, poverty and overcoming it all, to become a three time international boxing champion.

On August 14, 2012, St. John fought Christy Martin in a long-awaited rematch. Her dream of sixteen years finally materialized and at the age of 45, she captured the WBC super welter weight championship of the world.

On November 10, 2012, St. John was defeated by Tiffany Junot in Bakersfield, California, losing her WBC Female Super Welterweight Championship in a unanimous decision.

On April 14, 2016, St. John had her last boxing bout in New Zealand on the Kali Reis vs. Maricela Cornejo undercard as the curtain call. This was her retirement bout, winning by TKO in the 4th round.

In August 2018, St. John admitted to the use of prohibited substances including steroids and masking agents in preparation for around 20 bouts, stating that "everyone does it and everyone in boxing knows it."

MMA career 
On January 26, 2008, in Honolulu, Hawaii, St. John's fighting career took yet another turn. "Returning to her roots" in the martial arts, she competed in her first mixed martial arts (MMA) contest and, with a combination of kicks and punches, defeated her opponent Rhonda Gallegos with a first-round knockout.

Professional boxing record

Mixed martial arts record

|-
| Win
| align=center| 1–0
| Rhonda Gallegos
| KO (punches)
| X-1 Champions
| 
| align=center|1
| align=center|0:44
| Honolulu, Hawaii, United States
|
|}

References

External links 

 
 Split Decisions: Official Documentary on Mia St. John
 
 
 

1967 births
Living people
American boxers of Mexican descent
California State University, Northridge alumni
American women boxers
Doping cases in boxing
Featherweight boxers
American female taekwondo practitioners
American female mixed martial artists
Mixed martial artists utilizing boxing
Mixed martial artists utilizing taekwondo
American female models
American sportspeople in doping cases
Boxers from San Francisco
20th-century American women